Rayén Araya (born July 2, 1981 in Santiago de Chile) is a Chilean television and radio commentator. Best known for her work on Bío-Bío Communication's Radio and television news. Also known as co-anchor of news programs on various Chilean television channels.

Biography

Araya was born Macarena Rayén Araya Guerrero in Santiago de Chile, on July 2, 1981. She has one older brother named Manuel. In 1984 her family moved to Panamá until 1998. That year she entered the beauty pageant, where she was one of the finalists.

From 1999 to 2002 she co-hosted the television program Extra Jóvenes on Chilevisión, together with Martín Cárcamo, Paloma Aliaga, and Daniel Valenzuela. The show ran from 1986 to 2002, and some of the previous hosts were Felipe Camiroaga and Claudia Conserva.

In 2001 she worked on the cable channel Zona Latina hosting a musical program, Zona Joven.

From 2002 to 2006 she worked on Canal 13, starting as a musical correspondent and becoming a News co-anchor.

From 2002 to 2011 she worked on Mega, as the news co-anchor in the morning news, Radio Mega, and then in the evening news, Meganoticias Tarde.

At the beginning of 2012 she co-hosted the news in UCV TV, the Central Edition News, with Eduardo Riveros.

By the end of 2012 she started working for Bío-Bío Comunicaciones, on the radio and the television channel of the company: Radio Bío-Bío and Bío-Bío Chile TV. She is the host of the radio and TV programs Agenda Propia and Mesa de diálogo. Also works in Radiograma with Nibaldo Mosciatti.

Television

Web television

Radio

References

External links 
Agenda Propia, Web talk show, with Nibaldo Mosciatti
Mesa de diálogo, Web talk show
Bío Bío Comentarios, Editorials

Blog RayenAraya.BlogSpot.com
Instagram, rayenaraya
Biography in Wikichilenas

1981 births
People from Santiago
Chilean columnists
Chilean women journalists
Chilean radio presenters
Chilean television presenters
Radio reporters and correspondents
Living people
Chilean women columnists
Chilean women radio presenters
Chilean women television presenters
University of the Americas (Chile) alumni